Diaethria astala, the faded eighty-eight or navy eighty-eight, is a species of butterfly of the family Nymphalidae. It is found from Mexico to Colombia.

The larvae feed on Serjania, Paullinia and Cardiospermum species.

Subspecies
Diaethria astala astala (Mexico)
Diaethria astala asteria (Mexico)
Diaethria astala asteroide (Mexico)

External links
 Images
 Image

Biblidinae
Butterflies described in 1844
Nymphalidae of South America